Frank Dowling was a British newspaper editor.

Frank or Francis Dowling may also refer to:

Frank Dowling, a character in the film Alice Adams
Father Frank Dowling, character in Father Dowling Mysteries
Francis Dowling (politician), see Candidates of the Australian federal election, 1966

See also
John Francis Dowling (1851–?), Ontario physician and political figure